Elizabeth Anne "Z" Berg (born June 28, 1986) is an American musician. She was a founding member, guitarist, and lead vocalist of the indie rock group the Like. Berg's father is former Geffen Records A&R exec/record producer Tony Berg.

Musical career
Berg co-founded the Like along with members Charlotte Froom and Tennessee Thomas at the age of 15. Following the hiatus of the Like in 2011, Berg formed the band JJAMZ along with James Valentine (Maroon 5), Jason Boesel (Bright Eyes/Rilo Kiley), Alex Greenwald (Phantom Planet), and Michael Runion. Their debut album, Suicide Pact, was released on July 10, 2012, via Dangerbird Records.  Following Valentine's departure from the band it was renamed Phases, and a new record, For Life, was released under the new name and lineup on September 18, 2015.

Music critic Dan Cairns described her voice as "Björk meets Harriet Wheeler".

In 2018, Z Berg released four songs as a solo artist, "I Fall For the Same Face Every Time" and "I Go to Sleep" (released February 25, 2018) and "Time Flies" (released 11 May 2018). She also directed the music video for "Time Flies." Z Berg released the music video for her song "All out of Tears" on 26 September 2018 and the single was released on music platforms on 2 October 2018.

In December 2018, Berg collaborated with Ryan Ross on the Christmas single "The Bad List".

September 30, 2019 marked the first show of The Dead End Kids Club tour, a 7 show tour that she performed on alongside Ryan Ross, Dan Keyes, and Palm Springsteen. The tour concluded with a Halloween show in San Francisco on October 28, 2019.

Berg released her first solo album, Get Z to a Nunnery, in July 2020.

Discography
Studio albums
 Get Z to a Nunnery (2020)

EP
 Covers and Love Letters: Screaming into the Void (2021)

Digital singles
 "I Fall For the Same Face Every Time" 
 "I Go to Sleep" (2018)
 "Time Flies" (2018)
 "All Out of Tears" (2018)
 "The Bad List" (featuring Ryan Ross) (2018)

References

External links
 

Living people
American women singer-songwriters
Singer-songwriters from California
1986 births
Crossroads School alumni
21st-century American women singers
Phases (band) members
The Like members